RFA Tidespring is a  replenishment tanker of the British Royal Fleet Auxiliary (RFA). Built by DSME in 2016, the ship entered service with the Royal Fleet Auxiliary in November 2017.

Construction 
The construction of Tidespring was carried out by DSME in South Korea with her steel first being cut by RFA Commodore Rob Dorey on 24 June 2014. The ship was laid down on 22 December 2014 and launched four months later on 25 April 2015. A series of builders sea trials commenced from 29 March 2015 and were completed by 1 July 2016. The finalisation of electrical elements and the installation of Multi-Cable Transit insulation, as per new legislative regulations, caused a delay in the ship's delivery to the UK. On 5 February 2017, the ship departed South Korea for delivery to the UK, making stopovers at Yokosuka, Japan and Pearl Harbour, Hawaii. The ship transited the Panama Canal into the Atlantic Ocean and arrived in Falmouth, England on 31 March 2017. The ship was drydocked in Falmouth Docks for fitting out to be carried out by A&P Group on 27 April 2017. On 10 May 2017, a crane collapsed beside the ship whilst she was drydocked, however the vessel was not damaged in the incident.

She was officially accepted into the RFA on 27 November 2017.

Operational history

Tidespring and Queen Elizabeth instead carried out a full simulation of the scenario. In April, the ship participated in the bi-annual Exercise Joint Warrior, a large-scale NATO military exercise held off the coast of Scotland.

The ship underwent a maintenance refit at Cammell Laird's shipyard in Birkenhead in March 2019. A year later, the ship was involved in the largest Royal Navy response to a fleet of Russian warships in the North Sea. In September 2020, the ship accompanied  during sea drills in the Barents Sea alongside ships of the Danish, Norwegian and American navies.

References

External links 
 Official website

 

Tide-class tankers
2015 ships
Ships built by Daewoo Shipbuilding & Marine Engineering

es:RFA Tidespring (A136)